Lori Faith Lamel is a speech processing researcher known for her work with the TIMIT corpus of American English speech and for her work on voice activity detection, speaker recognition, and other non-linguistic inferences from speech signals. She works for the French National Centre for Scientific Research (CNRS) as a senior research scientist in the Spoken Language Processing Group of the Laboratoire d'Informatique pour la Mécanique et les Sciences de l'Ingénieur.

Education and career
Lamel was a student at the Massachusetts Institute of Technology (MIT), where she earned bachelor's and master's degrees in electrical engineering and computer science in 1980 as a co-op student with Bell Labs. She earned her Ph.D. at MIT in 1988, with the dissertation Formalizing Knowledge used in Spectrogram Reading: Acoustic and perceptual evidence from stops supervised by Victor Zue. She completed a habilitation in 2004 at Paris-Sud University.

She was a visiting researcher at CNRS in 1989–1990, became a researcher for CNRS in 1991, and was promoted to senior researcher in 2005.

Recognition
Lamel was named a fellow of the International Speech Communication Association in 2015, "for contributions to human-machine interaction via multilingual speech processing". She was named a Fellow of the IEEE in 2021, "for contributions to automatic speech recognition".

References

External links

Home page

Year of birth missing (living people)
Living people
American computer scientists
American women computer scientists
French computer scientists
French women computer scientists
Massachusetts Institute of Technology alumni
Speech processing researchers
Fellow Members of the IEEE
21st-century American women